The 2024 United States Senate election in Delaware will be held on November 5, 2024, to elect a member of the United States Senate to represent the state of Delaware. Incumbent four-term Democrat Tom Carper was re-elected with 60.0% of the vote in 2018.

Democratic primary

Candidates

Publicly expressed interest
 Lisa Blunt Rochester, U.S. Representative from 
 Tom Carper, incumbent U.S. Senator

Potential 
 John Carney, Governor of Delaware and former U.S. Representative from

Republican primary

Potential
Rob Arlett, Former Sussex County Councilman, former Delaware State Chairman for the Trump campaign, and nominee for this seat in 2018
Rocky De La Fuente, businessman, perennial candidate, and candidate for this seat in 2018

General election

Predictions

References

2024
Delaware
United States Senate